Liechtenstein's one railway line is operated by Austrian Federal Railways. As such, it represents an exception to the more usual Liechtenstein practice of co-operating closely with Switzerland, as in the case of the principality's use of the Swiss franc as its currency and its membership of a common customs area with its western neighbour. The railway carries international services between Austria and Switzerland, most of which run non-stop through the principality, although a number of local stopping trains do call at three of the four stations located in Liechtenstein.

System

This line links Feldkirch, Austria, and Buchs, Switzerland. It is electrified using the standard system used in both Austria and Switzerland (15 kV with overhead wiring).

Railway stations

Liechtenstein has only three railway stations currently in service on the Feldkirch-Buchs line and one station which is disused.

Currently in operation: 
Schaan-Vaduz (located in Schaan, also serving Vaduz)
Forst Hilti (located at the headquarters of Hilti, in the northern suburb of Schaan)
Nendeln (located in Nendeln, a civil parish of Eschen) 

These stations are served by a limited number of stopping services between Feldkirch, Austria and Buchs, Switzerland: four to five trains each way in the early morning and late afternoon on Mondays to Fridays only. Whilst EuroCity and other long-distance international trains also make use of the route, they do not call at the stations in Liechtenstein.

Disused:
Schaanwald (located in Schaanwald, a civil parish of Mauren)

The station opened in 1902. It was staffed until 1988. Over time the number of trains stopping at the station diminished considerably. From 2010 until 2012 only one train per day stopped here. From 2013 the station has no longer been served.

Bus links
Most public transport in Liechtenstein is bus-operated, including links from Buchs and Sargans railway stations in Switzerland to Vaduz. Liechtenstein Bus is the main operator.

Gallery

See also
Transport in Liechtenstein
Rail transport in Austria
Rail transport in Switzerland

References

External links

 
Railway stations
Liechtenstein